1,2-Bis(diphenylphosphino)ethane (dppe) is an organophosphorus compound with the formula (PhPCH) (Ph = phenyl). It is a commonly used bidentate ligand in coordination chemistry. It is a white solid that is soluble in organic solvents.

Preparation
The preparation of dppe is by the alkylation of NaPPh:
P(CH) + 2 Na → NaP(CH) + NaCH
NaP(CH), which is readily air-oxidized, is treated with 1,2-dichloroethane (ClCHCHCl) to give dppe:
2 NaP(CH) + ClCHCHCl → (CH)PCHCHP(CH) + 2 NaCl

Reactions
The reduction of dppe by lithium to give PhHP(CH)PHPh has been reported.
PhP(CH)PPh + 4 Li → PhLiP(CH)PLiPh + 2 PhLi
Hydrolysis gives the bis(secondary phosphine):
PhLiP(CH)PLiPh + 2 PhLi + 4HO → PhHP(CH)PHPh + 4 LiOH + 2 CH

Treatment of dppe with conventional oxidants such as hydrogen peroxide (HO), aqueous bromine (Br), etc., produces dppeO in low yield (e.g., 13%) as a result of non-selective oxidation. Selective mono-oxidation of dppe can be achieved by reaction with PhCHBr to give dppeO.

Hydrogenation of dppe gives the ligand bis(dicyclohexylphosphino)ethane.

Coordination complexes
Many coordination complexes of dppe are known, and some are used as homogeneous catalysts.  Dppe is almost invariably chelating, although there are examples of monodentate (e.g., W(CO)(dppe)) and of bridging behavior.  The natural bite angle is 86°.

Related compounds
1,2-Bis(dimethylphosphino)ethane
Bis(diphenylphosphino)methane

References

Chelating agents
Diphosphines
Phenyl compounds
1,2-Ethanediyl compounds